Steven Philip Rotheram (born 4 November 1961) is a British Labour politician who has served as the Metro Mayor of the Liverpool City Region since 2017.

Born and raised in Kirkby, Rotheram left school to become a bricklayer and set up his own construction company at the age of 22. He earned a Master's in Contemporary Urban Renaissance from Liverpool Hope University and worked as a business manager for the Learning and Skills Council before he was elected to represent Fazakerley for Labour on Liverpool City Council from 2002 to 2011. He also served as the Lord Mayor of Liverpool from 2008 to 2009 and the MP for Liverpool Walton from 2010 to 2017.

After working as Jeremy Corbyn's Parliamentary Private Secretary, Rotheram won a majority vote in the Liverpool City Region mayoral election 2017 and was re-elected in 2021.

Early life
Steven Philip Rotheram was born in Kirkby on 4 November 1961, the son of housewife Dorothy (née Phillips) and forklift driver Harry Rotheram. His father also served as a Labour Party councillor. He has seven siblings and attended Ruffwood School in Kirkby. His parents divorced when he was a teenager, which Rotheram later partly attributed to his father's absences caused by his devotion to his political career.

Career

Pre-politics
Rotheram left school at the age of 16 to become a bricklayer, setting up his own company at the age of 22. He spent eight months rebuilding war-torn infrastructure in the Falkland Islands in 1983, an experience he did not enjoy. On his return, disillusioned by what he saw as the exploitation of employees on British building sites, he was determined not to work for anyone else again and set up the company Rotheram Builders. Alongside his work in the construction industry, he studied part-time in order to gain admittance to Liverpool John Moores University, where he studied full-time before starting a Master's in Contemporary Urban Renaissance at Liverpool Hope University. He worked as a business manager for the Learning and Skills Council for many years after graduating.

Lord Mayor of Liverpool
Rotheram was elected to represent Fazakerley as a Labour Councillor for Liverpool City Council in the 2002 election. He later served as Lord Mayor of Liverpool from 2008 to 2009, which coincided with Liverpool's period as European Capital of Culture. In a 2009 speech on the 20th anniversary of the Hillsborough disaster, he said, "I'm one of the fortunate ones, as I swapped my Leppings Lane ticket for a stand seat 15 minutes before kick-off... if I can go from being a brickie in Kirkby to the Lord Mayor, who knows what these 96 people may have achieved in their lives?"

Member of Parliament
After incumbent Labour MP Peter Kilfoyle announced that he would be standing down as MP for Liverpool Walton in 2010, Rotheram was overwhelmingly selected to be the Labour candidate securing 101 out of 113 votes cast by the local association. At the 2010 general election, Rotheram retained the seat with a comfortable majority of 19,818. Shortly after becoming an MP, he was elected to serve on the Communities and Local Government Committee. In October 2011, Rotheram joined the Culture, Media and Sport Committee where he asked James Murdoch if he would close The Sun newspaper following the News International phone hacking scandal in 2011.

In October 2011, Rotheram gave an emotional speech to the House of Commons where he read out the names of all 96 Hillsborough disaster victims so they would be recorded in Hansard, and called for the release of all government papers relating to the disaster. After the papers were released in September 2012, showing widespread corruption from South Yorkshire Police, Rotheram called upon Prime Minister David Cameron to issue an apology on behalf of the government, which he later did.

Rotheram was the chief organiser of a charity single designed to raise funds to cover the legal costs of the Hillsborough families which attracted the attention of the award-winning music producer Guy Chambers. In September 2012, along with members of The Farm, Mick Jones, and former Liverpool manager Kenny Dalglish, Rotheram arranged for a number of artists to record a cover of "He Ain't Heavy, He's My Brother" as "The Justice Collective", in an attempt to reach the coveted Christmas UK number one. The cover included contributions from artists such as Paul McCartney, Robbie Williams, Holly Johnson and Melanie C, as well as featuring Rotheram himself. On 23 December 2012, it was confirmed that the cover had become Christmas number one, which Rotheram called "an honour".

Rotheram was one of 16 signatories of an open letter to Ed Miliband in January 2015 calling on the party to commit to oppose further austerity, take rail franchises back into public ownership and strengthen collective bargaining arrangements. Rotheram was the Labour leader Jeremy Corbyn's Parliamentary Private Secretary.

Liverpool Region Metro Mayor
In 2016, Rotheram said he intended to stand for the Labour nomination to become Liverpool region metro mayor in the 2017 mayoral election, and was selected as the Labour candidate in August 2016. He announced that he would not seek re-election as a Member of Parliament if successful in the Mayoral Election. Rotheram was subsequently elected mayor in 2017. In September of the same year, he was named at Number 73 in 'The 100 Most Influential People on the Left' by LBC.

Rotheram's first months in power were focused on setting up the Liverpool City Region Combined Authority. Improving the region's transport infrastructure and connectivity was a pillar of his mayoral campaign and became the primary focus of his first term in office. In 2019, alongside Andy Burnham, he led a successful campaign to strip Northern Rail of their franchise, after services had become blighted by disruption. During his first term, Rotheram oversaw major upgrades to the Merseyrail network, including the introduction of a 52-strong fleet of new trains, the result of a £460 million investment by the Combined Authority. In June 2018, he opened the first new station on the network in over 20 years at Maghull North station.

In 2019, Rotheram introduced half-price travel for apprentices aged 19-24 and launched Be More, a UCAS-style apprenticeship portal. In his Mayoral campaign, Rotheram pledged to address “the scandal of rough sleeping in Liverpool City Region” and in 2019, he launched the first phase of the Housing First programme in 2019, an £8 million pilot scheme providing homes and support to homeless people across the region. 

In 2019, the Liverpool City Region Combined Authority became the first in the country to declare a climate emergency and has set a target to be net zero carbon by 2040 or sooner. Rotheram has said he “wants Liverpool City Region to be at the forefront of the Green Industrial Revolution” by investing environmental projects, improving public transport and exploring the potential for a tidal project in the River Mersey. 

Amidst the COVID-19 pandemic, Rotheram accepted a deal with the British government in October 2020 to place the Liverpool City Region under Tier 3 restrictions, following a sharp rise in cases across northern England. Despite facing strong criticism for agreeing to impose restrictive measures on the region, he was successful in securing additional government support for businesses affected by the restrictions. Following his re-election, he announced a £150 million COVID Recovery Fund to support the economy and create jobs as the region emerged from the pandemic. 

In the election of 6 May 2021, Rotheram was re-elected for a second term with an increased majority. In January 2022, Rotheram, alongside Greater Manchester Mayor Andy Burnham, renewed calls for a Hillsborough Law to ensure fair treatment for people bereaved in public tragedies. In February 2022, the Combined Authority approved Rotheram's plans introduce a bus franchising model, which would give the authority the power greater control over the region’s bus network and the ability to set bus routes, timetables and fares.

Personal life
Rotheram and his wife, psychiatric nurse Sandra, have three children together. His two daughters survived the 2017 Manchester Arena bombing.

Notes

References

External links
Official MP website
Metro Mayor website
 The full transcript of Rotheram's Hillsborough debate speech, delivered in the House of Commons on 17 October 2011

1961 births
Living people
Alumni of Liverpool John Moores University
Councillors in Liverpool
Labour Party (UK) MPs for English constituencies
UK MPs 2010–2015
UK MPs 2015–2017
Members of the Parliament of the United Kingdom for Liverpool constituencies
People from Kirkby
Labour Party (UK) mayors
Mayors of places in Cheshire
Mayors of places in Merseyside